Christ Church refers to both an Episcopal parish currently located in Matapeake, Maryland and the historic church building located in the Stevensville Historic District in Stevensville, Maryland, which the parish occupied from 1880 to 1995, and that is now a Lutheran church.  Christ Church Parish was one of the original 30 Anglican parishes in the Province of Maryland.

History
The Christ Episcopal Church of Kent Island is recognized as the state's oldest Christian congregation.  It was founded in 1632 by the Reverend Richard James, one year after Kent Island was founded by William Claiborne, and two years before settlers arrived at St. Clement's Island.  The parish has used at least six buildings during its history.  The church's original location was at Kent Fort.  It moved to Broad Creek in 1652, and was rebuilt there in 1712 and again in 1826.  The church moved again to Stevensville in 1880 as activity shifted there from Broad Creek, and to its current location in Matapeake in 1995 due to the need for a larger building.  Of the six buildings, only the 1880 and 1995 buildings are standing today.  The 1880 building was listed on the National Register of Historic Places in 1979.
  Today, Christ Church is part of the Episcopal Diocese of Easton and owns and operates Camp Wright, a summer camp in Matapeake, which serves as the diocesan camp. The historic building is now the principal church of the Anglo-Lutheran Catholic Church.

Gallery

See also
List of the oldest churches in the United States#Oldest Continuous Church Congregations

References

External links

Christ Church Parish, Kent Island- Current website of the parish
Christ Lutheran Church - ALCC - Website of the Lutheran congregation now owning the historic Christ Church building.
Historic Christ Church, Stevensville - Historic Sites Consortium of Queen Anne's County
, including photo in 1979, at Maryland Historical Trust website

1632 establishments in Maryland
Episcopal church buildings in Maryland
Kent Island, Maryland
Churches on the National Register of Historic Places in Maryland
Churches in Queen Anne's County, Maryland
Queen Anne architecture in Maryland
Churches completed in 1880
19th-century Episcopal church buildings
Historic district contributing properties in Maryland
Individually listed contributing properties to historic districts on the National Register in Maryland
National Register of Historic Places in Queen Anne's County, Maryland